Page is the first studio album by South Korean singer-songwriter Kang Seung-yoon. It was released by YG Entertainment on March 29, 2021. The physical album was released in three versions: the Epilogue version, the Prologue version and the Kit version. The album contains 12 tracks, including the lead single "Iyah". Page has sold 122,202 copies in South Korea as of May 2021.

Background and promotion
On March 18, 2021, YG Entertainment reported that Kang Seung-yoon would be making a comeback on March 29 and confirmed the album title. On March 22, YG revealed the album's track-list. On March 23, the concept teaser of the album was released. The video features Seung-yoon sitting between black and white toned lights, which slowly changed to blue, red and purple, symbolizing the variety of musical colors he will show through the album. On March 29, the sampler for Seung-yoon's new album was released.

On March 29, Seung-yoon held an online media showcase for the release of Page. During the showcase, Seung-yoon described the lead single "Iyah" as a song responsibilities and burdens of becoming an adult as one gets older.

Critical reception

Billboard Vietnam described the album as "carrying the most sincere messages that [Seung-yoon] wants to send to himself as well as to his fans". Writing for online magazine IZM, Hong-hyun Lee praised Seung-yoon for his songwriting and stated "it makes no sense to worry about the talented musician's actions". Lizet Chavez from Vacancy Magazine regarded the album as "raw and vulnerable access to [Yoon's] last ten years in music and on the person those years helped shape today".

Commercial performance
On April 6, 2021, it was reported that the pre-orders of the album has surpassed a total of 100,000 orders, as of April 5. On the chart issued April 2021, Page debuted at number 3 on the South Korean Gaon Album Chart, scoring 122,202 copies of monthly sales.

Composition
Seung-yoon participated in the composing and writing of Page. He explained that Page is about himself and the messages he would like to spread. "Better" (featuring Mino) is a song about regrets and attachment on past relationships. The special track "Iyah" (featuring Yoon Jong-shin) is "formed with a format of Yoon Jong-shin answering to the questions of life Yoon had for the past 10 years". Regarding "Tread on Me", Seung-yoon explained, "I spotted a sprout while walking on the streets. I admired it. While I was trying to take a photo of the sprout in the pavements, a pedestrian stepped on the sprout. That’s when I wrote it on the memo". In a commentary film uploaded by YG Entertainment through their official blog, Yoon explained that the lead single "Iyah" is "a story to myself. It began with the thought, ‘What would I like to tell myself when I’m worn out’".

Artwork and packaging
Seung-yoon released three album versions for Page. The "Prologue" and "Epilogue" versions include a 104-page hardcover photobook, an accordion lyric book, a random photocard, a random polaroid, a random poster, a double-sided poster and a random postcard. The "KiT" version includes a package box, a random Air KiT, a lyric photocard set, a selfie photocard, and masking tape.

Track listing

Charts

Weekly charts

Monthly charts

Year-end charts

Sales

Release history

References

External links

2021 albums
YG Entertainment albums
Korean-language albums